Japan competed at the 1952 Summer Olympics in Helsinki, Finland.  Japan returned to the Olympic Games after not being invited to the 1948 Summer Olympics because of the nations's role in World War II. 69 competitors, 58 men and 11 women, took part in 60 events in 13 sports.

Medalists

| width=78% align=left valign=top |

| width=22% align=left valign=top |

Athletics

Boxing

Cycling

Road Competition
Men's Individual Road Race (190.4 km)
Kihei Tomioka — did not finish (→ no ranking)
Masazumi Tajima — did not finish (→ no ranking)
Tadashi Kato — did not finish (→ no ranking)
Tamotsu Chikanari — did not finish (→ no ranking)

Track Competition
Men's 1.000m Time Trial
Tadashi Kato
 Final — 1:23.2 (→ 26th place)

Men's 1.000m Sprint Scratch Race
Kihei Tomioka — 23rd place

Diving

Men's 3m Springboard
Katsuichi Mori
 Preliminary Round — 65.23 points (→ 15th place)

Women's 10m Platform
Masami Miyamoto
 Preliminary Round — 36.24 points (→ 11th place)

Equestrian

Fencing

One fencer, Shinichi Maki, represented Japan in 1952.

Men's foil
 Shinichi Maki

Men's épée
 Shinichi Maki

Men's sabre
 Shinichi Maki

Gymnastics

Rowing

Japan had five male rowers participate in one out of seven rowing events in 1952.

 Men's coxed four
 Kosuke Matsuo
 Ryuji Goto
 Kazuo Kanda
 Toshiya Takeuchi
 Tamatsu Kogure (cox)

Sailing

Shooting

One shooter represented Japan in 1952.
Men

Swimming

Weightlifting

Wrestling

See also
Japan at the 1951 Asian Games

References

External links
Official Olympic Reports
International Olympic Committee results database

Nations at the 1952 Summer Olympics
1952
Summer Olympics